Wilfred Hepburn (25 August 1910 – 7 September 1973) was a New Zealand cricketer. He played in seven first-class matches for Wellington from 1931 to 1941.

See also
 List of Wellington representative cricketers

References

External links
 

1910 births
1973 deaths
New Zealand cricketers
Wellington cricketers
Cricketers from Wellington City